Friary Island is an island in the River Thames in England on the reach above Bell Weir Lock, on the approach to Old Windsor Lock at Wraysbury, Berkshire. It is just across the river from Old Windsor, where there was a friary from which it took its name.

The island is inhabited, with about 40 houses, and is accessible via a road bridge.

See also
Islands in the River Thames

References

Islands of the River Thames
Royal Borough of Windsor and Maidenhead